Maciej Ciszewski (born 21 December 1971) is a Polish fencer. He competed in the individual and team épée events at the 1992 Summer Olympics.

References

1971 births
Living people
Polish male fencers
Olympic fencers of Poland
Fencers at the 1992 Summer Olympics
Sportspeople from Wrocław